The Other Girl can mean:

The Other Girl (film)
The Other Girl (song)